In language, an archaism  is a word, a sense of a word, or a style of speech or writing that belongs to a historical epoch beyond living memory, but that has survived in a few practical settings or affairs. Lexical archaisms are single archaic words or expressions used regularly in an affair (e.g. religion or law) or freely; literary archaism is the survival of archaic language in a traditional literary text such as a nursery rhyme or the deliberate use of a style characteristic of an earlier age—for example, in his 1960 novel The Sot-Weed Factor, John Barth writes in an 18th-century style.  Archaic words or expressions may have distinctive emotional connotations—some can be humorous (forsooth), some highly formal (What say you?), and some solemn (With thee do I plight my troth). 

A distinction between archaic and obsolete words and word senses is widely used by dictionaries. An archaic word or sense is one that still has some current use but whose use has dwindled to a few specialized contexts, outside which it connotes old-fashioned language. In contrast, an obsolete word or sense is one that is no longer used at all. A reader encounters them when reading texts that are centuries old. For example, the works of Shakespeare are old enough that some obsolete words or senses are encountered therein, for which glosses (annotations) are often provided in the margins.

Archaisms can either be used deliberately (to achieve a specific effect) or as part of a specific jargon (for example in law) or formula (for example in religious contexts).  Many nursery rhymes contain archaisms.  Some archaisms called fossil words remain in use within certain fixed expressions despite having faded away in all other contexts (for example, vim is not used in normal English outside the set phrase vim and vigor).

An outdated form of language is called archaic. In contrast, a language or dialect that contains many archaic traits (archaisms) relative to closely related languages or dialects spoken at the same time is called conservative.

Usage
Archaisms are most frequently encountered in history, poetry, fantasy literature, law, philosophy, science, technology, geography and ritual writing and speech. Archaisms are kept alive by these ritual and literary uses and by the study of older literature. Should they remain recognised, they can potentially be revived.

Because they are things of continual discovery and re-invention, science and technology have historically generated forms of speech and writing which have dated and fallen into disuse relatively quickly. However, the emotional associations of certain words have kept them alive, for example: 'Wireless' rather than 'Radio' for a generation of British citizens who lived through the Second World War, even though the older word 'wireless' is an archaism, and in recent years the term has gained renewed popularity.

A similar desire to evoke a former age means that archaic place names are frequently used in circumstances where doing so conveys a political or emotional subtext, or when the official new name is not recognised by all (for example: 'Madras' rather than 'Chennai'). So, a restaurant seeking to conjure up historic associations might prefer to call itself Old Bombay or refer to Persian cuisine in preference to using the newer place name. A notable contemporary example is the name of the airline Cathay Pacific, which uses the archaic Cathay ("China").

Archaisms are frequently misunderstood, leading to changes in usage.  One example is found in the phrase "the odd man out", which originally came from the phrase "to find the odd man out", where the verb "to find out" has been split by its object "the odd man", meaning the item which does not fit. The object + split verb has been reinterpreted as a noun + adjective, such that "out" describes the man rather than any verb.

The pronominal adverbs found in the writing of lawyers (e.g. heretofore, hereunto, thereof) are examples of archaisms as a form of jargon. Some phraseologies, especially in religious contexts, retain archaic elements that are not used in ordinary speech in any other context: "With this ring I thee wed."  Archaisms are also used in the dialogue of historical novels in order to evoke the flavour of the period.  Some may count as inherently funny words and are used for humorous effect.

Examples 
A type of archaism is the use of thou, the second-person singular pronoun that fell out of general use in the 17th century, while you or ye, formerly only used to address groups, and then also to respectfully address individuals, is now used to address both individuals and groups. Thou is the nominative form; the oblique/objective form is thee (functioning as both accusative and dative), and the possessive is thy or thine.

Though thou hast ever so many counsellors, yet do not forsake the counsel of thy own soul.
— English proverb
Today me, tomorrow thee.
— English proverb

The meaning of this proverb is that something that happens to a person, is likely to eventually happen to another who observes it, especially if the two people are similar.

To thine own self be true.
 —William Shakespeare

The meaning of this saying is simply that it is unwise to lie to yourself. In its contemporary context it meant to be true (loyal, faithful, supportive) to one's own interests (the 'self' of person, property, and goals). In other words, put yourself before others.

Archaisms in proverbs are often retained, far longer than in other parts of the language. This is because they make the proverbs "fall easier on the tongue",
and also because of the rhetorical effect they evoke by the use of two of the four fundamental operations in rhetoric. Namely, permutation (immutatio) and addition (adiectio).

See also
 Anachronism
 Fossil word
 Historical linguistics
 Legal English
 Linguistic conservatism
 List of alternative country names
 List of archaic technological nomenclature
 Neologism
 Thou
 Ye olde

References

External links
 Archaism entry in the UCLA Encyclopedia of Egyptology

 
Lexicology